Youth Without Youth is a 1976 novella by Romanian author Mircea Eliade. It follows the life of Dominic Matei, an elderly Romanian intellectual who experiences a cataclysmic event that allows him to live a new life with startling intellectual capacity.  In 2007, it was adapted into a film by Francis Ford Coppola, also titled Youth Without Youth.

References

External links
 Scholars of religion discuss Youth Without Youth

1976 novels
Romanian novellas
Romanian novels
Romanian short stories
Bucharest in fiction
1976 short stories
Novels set in Romania
Works by Mircea Eliade
Romanian novels adapted into films